Faas may refer to:

People

Given name 
Faas Wilkes (1923–2006), Dutch football forward

Surname 
Ellis Faas (1962–2020), Dutch makeup artist
Horst Faas (1933–2012), German photo-journalist and two-time Pulitzer Prize winner
Robert Faas (1889–1966), German footballer

Other 
 Function as a service
 Fellow of the African Academy of Sciences
 Faas (film), a 2022 Indian Marathi film 

Dutch-language surnames
German-language surnames
Patronymic surnames